Curse of the Undead is a 1959 American horror Western film directed by Edward Dein and starring Eric Fleming, Michael Pate and Kathleen Crowley.

Plot

In an Old West town, young girls are dying of a mysterious wasting disease. Dr. John Carter and his daughter Dolores have been tending to patients for hours, but just lost another. After Preacher Dan Young's nightlong vigil, Cora looks like she will survive. During breakfast with Cora's parents, they hear Cora scream. Cora is found dead on her bed, her window open. As he kneels to pray, Dan notices two small, bloody holes in Cora's throat.

Returning to their ranch, Doc Carter finds his son Tim extremely upset after the actions of their neighbor Buffer, including damming a stream on the Carter ranch and having his men assault anyone who complains. Doc drives back into town to see the local sheriff. The Sheriff's discussion with Buffer proves unsuccessful, however, and a black-clad stranger follows Doc Carter's buckboard. By the time he gets home, the Doc is dead, his throat bloody. Grief-stricken, Tim snaps after learning a fence has been torn down and cattle are escaping. Convinced Buffer is responsible, Tim goes after him and is killed by Buffer. Dolores hangs up "Gun Wanted" posters all over town, offering $100 to anyone who can gun down the "murderer"; After the stranger promises to kill Buffer, one of the rancher's men shoots at the stranger. As the stranger leaves, Buffer sacks the man despite his insisting he hit his target dead center.

The stranger, calling himself Drake Robey, arrives at the Carter ranch. He reacts to a thorn cross on a button worn by Dan. When asked, Dan says it was an ordination gift; the thorn coming from the site of the Crucifixion. Despite Dan's protests, Dolores hires Robey. He moves into the house, and that night, Robey sneaks into Dolores' room and drinks some of her blood. Next morning, Dan finds Dolores looking tired, complaining of cold and very compliant. Dolores and Dan spend the day looking for her father's will. They find a map showing the property had once belonged to a Spanish family, the Robles, sold it suffering "some kind of tragedy". Dan takes the paperwork, including a locked safety box, home with him to continue the search. After Dan leaves, Robey comes to see Dolores and he talks Dolores into hiring him as a night range-rider who can keep an eye on Buffer and his men. She offers him the cemetery caretaker's cottage to stay in if he doesn't mind being near the dead; Robey says "The dead don't bother me – it's the living that causes me trouble."

At home, Dan knocks over the safety box, cracking it open. Within it, he finds the 1860 diary of Don Miguel Robles, the former owner of the land. According to the diary, Don Robles sent his son Drago to Madrid on business without his new bride Isabella. Isabella turned to Drago's brother Roberto for companionship. When Drago returns and learns of their relationship, he killed his brother with a dagger; distraught, Drago later committed suicide with the same dagger. Over the next six months, mysterious deaths of young girls take place. One night Don Robles hears Isabella scream and went to her room, finding a man bent over her – Drago Robles, who fled, leaving Isabella drained of blood. To end the curse, Don Robles plunged a silver dagger through Drago's heart as he lay in his coffin. After confessing his actions to the priest he learned a wooden stake is needed to destroy a vampire – he returns but finds the coffin empty except for the dagger. Hidden within the diary is a photograph of Drago Robles – it is Drake Robey in Spanish clothing.

As Dan reads Don Robles' diary, Robey summons a sleeping Dolores to him, but is interrupted by the sheriff. After hearing the sheriff denounce him to Dolores, Robey follows him back to town and kills him with his bite. As Dan starts back to his house after examining the body, he is followed by Robey. In a panic he races for the church; Robey enters the shadow of the church cross and flees. Back in his house, Dan is confronted by Robey who defends his actions, protesting "What I am is not my own choice. You should pity me, not judge me in my torment. Do you think I wanted this?" before attacking Dan. Dan's housekeeper interrupts the attack and Robey flees with his photograph and the Rancho Robles map.

When Dan tells Dolores about the evening's events, she doesn't believe him. Dan takes her to the family crypt to find Drago Robles' empty coffin, except for a silver dagger. When Dan insists they look in every coffin for Robey – including her father and brother – Dolores explodes and throws him out. After Dan leaves to get a court order to do so, Dolores, apparently weakened by blood loss, her anger at Dan, and Robey's hypnotic influence, collapses. Robey emerges from a Carter coffin to feed from Dolores before carrying her back home. After Dolores awakens, Robey shows her the Rancho Robles map; the stream Buffer has been damming is on her property, not his. Robey goes into town to show the map to Buffer, who angrily shoots Robey. Robey fires back, killing Buffer, and walks away unscathed.

Robey reports back to Dolores when she sees a bullet hole in his vest – he claims his cigar case stopped Buffer's bullet. Robey learns that Dan is heading for the county seat to get a court order to open the graves. Robey promises to join with Dolores to stop him. Warned by Dolores' housekeeper, Dan makes preparations. Robey heads for town to "talk" Dan out of getting that court order, but Dan will not be stopped. They challenge each other to a shoot-out, and Dan fires first, just as Dolores arrives. Robey collapses and disintegrates into dust, leaving only his empty clothes behind. Dan walks over to Robey's clothes and picks up his bullet...which has his thorn cross on it.

Cast
 Eric Fleming as Preacher Dan 
 Michael Pate as Drake Robey
 Kathleen Crowley as Dolores Carter
 John Hoyt as Dr Carter
 Bruce Gordon as Buffer
 Edward Binns as Sheriff
 Jimmy Murphy as Tim Carter
 Helen Kleeb as Dora
 Jay Adler as Bartender
 Eddie Parker as Henchman (as Edwin Parker)
 John Truax as Henchman
 Frankie Van as Henchman
 Rush Williams as Henchmen

Themes
Curse of the Undead deliberately sets itself out as different not only because it is a horror Western, but because it returns to European vampire folklore rather than rely on Universal's mythology or the Hammer version of Dracula which had been released the previous year, although it did keep the idea of Robey transforming into a bat, which is a cinematic creation, not a part of European folklore. Robey is a vampire not because he was the victim of another vampire, but because he committed the mortal sin of suicide – well into the nineteenth century suicides were buried at crossroads to prevent them from returning as vampires. Because of this, none of Robey's victims will be returning from the dead. Also unlike the film iconography of the previous fifty-odd years, Robey is not incinerated by exposure to the daylight; the pre-cinema vampires were perfectly capable of walking in the sunlight. The final method of Robey's destruction is definitely unique, but appropriate for both the myth and the setting. Preacher Dan's thorn cross, supposedly originating from the site of the Crucifixion, is destructive to the vampire both because of its form (a cross) and its source (Calvary); its supernatural powers are made clear by the fact that it survives being shot from a gun (a normal thorn would have been destroyed). Placing the cross on a bullet used in an old-fashioned Western shootout simply makes it part of the setting.

Production

Curse of the Undead started as a gag idea by husband-and-wife team Edward and Mildred Dein. Universal-International producer Joseph Gershenson heard about the idea from his wife and quickly phoned Edward Dein: "Hey, smartass. The good stuff you don't give us. I want to make this picture." According to an early studio announcement the film was intended as a satire of the vampire theme set in the Old West.

Release

Critical response

Dennis Schwartz of Ozus' World Movie Reviews rated the film a score B−, calling it "A gimmicky B horror-western, that soon wears thin". Dave Sindelar of Fantastic Movie Musings and Ramblings called it " the most successful merging of the western and horror genres", while also criticizing the film's soundtrack, and some of the performances. TV Guide awarded the film one out of four stars, calling the film "mediocre".

Shown on the MeTV show Svengoolie on June 19, 2021.

See also 
 Billy the Kid Versus Dracula (1966)
 Jesse James Meets Frankenstein's Daughter (1966)
 Near Dark (1987)
 Vampire film
 Sundown: The Vampire in Retreat (1989)

References

External links

 
 
 
 
 

1959 films
1959 horror films
1950s Western (genre) horror films
American Western (genre) horror films
1950s English-language films
Films about curses
Universal Pictures films
American vampire films
Films directed by Edward Dein
1950s American films